Steven T. Bramwell (born 7 June 1961) is a British physicist and chemist who works at the London Centre for Nanotechnology and the Department of Physics and Astronomy,  University College London. He is known for his experimental discovery of spin ice with M. J. Harris and his calculation of a critical exponent observed in two-dimensional magnets with P. C. W. Holdsworth. A probability distribution for global quantities in complex systems,
the "Bramwell-Holdsworth-Pinton (BHP) distribution", (to be implemented in Mathematica) is named after him.

In 2009 Bramwell's group was one of several to report experimental evidence of magnetic monopole excitations in spin ice. He coined the term "magnetricity" to describe currents of these effective magnetic "monopoles" in condensed-matter systems.

Bramwell studied chemistry at Oxford University, obtaining his PhD in 1989. He was a professor of physical chemistry at University College London from 2000-2009, before becoming a Professor in the Department of Physics and Astronomy.

Honours and distinctions
Bramwell was awarded the 2010 Holweck Prize of the British Institute of Physics and the Société Française de Physique (SFP) for "pioneering new concepts in the experimental and theoretical study of spin systems".  He shared the 2012 Europhysics Prize of the European Physical Society Condensed Matter Division "for the prediction and experimental observation of magnetic monopoles in spin ice".  He is a Fellow of the Institute of Physics.

In 2010 he won the Times Higher Education research project of the year for "magnetricity",  and was named by The Times on their list of the 100 top UK scientists.

Selected publications

References

External links 
Steve Bramwell | London Centre for Nanotechnology
Survey of two dimensional critical exponents by Taroni, Bramwell and Holdsworth

Steve Bramwell discusses Marie and Pierre Curie on Radio 4’s In Our Time

British physicists
1961 births
Living people
British chemists
Academics of University College London
Alumni of the University of Oxford